Leslie D. King (born January 17, 1949) is a justice of the Mississippi Supreme Court.

Early life and education
King graduated from Coleman High School in Greenville, Mississippi in 1966 and then attended the University of Mississippi.
When King graduated from the University of Mississippi in 1970, he was one of only three African American students in his graduating class.

King earned his Juris Doctor from Texas Southern University School of Law in 1973.

King has worked as a lawyer in private practice, as a municipal-court judge, as a public prosecutor and as a public defender. In 1979, King was elected to the Mississippi House of Representatives, serving from 1980 to 1994. In 1994, King was elected to the Mississippi Court of Appeals, where he served until his appointment to the Mississippi Supreme Court in 2011. King is only the 4th African American to serve as a Mississippi Supreme Court Justice in the state's history.

Judicial service
On February 23, 2011, Governor Haley Barbour appointed King to the Mississippi Supreme Court.

In March 2018, King dissented when the majority found that sentencing a juvenile to life without parole was not contrary to Miller v. Alabama (2012).

References

1949 births
Living people
Politicians from Greenville, Mississippi
University of Mississippi alumni
African-American judges
Justices of the Mississippi Supreme Court
Mississippi Court of Appeals judges
Texas Southern University alumni
Thurgood Marshall School of Law alumni
21st-century American judges
21st-century African-American people
20th-century African-American people
Public defenders
American prosecutors